Pacific Heights is a semi-rural locality in the Livingstone Shire, Queensland, Australia.

Geography 
Pacific Heights is in the hinterland of the Capricorn Coast.

Farnborough Road is the eastern border of the locality with suburban development connecting via that road. Behind the suburban development, there is a land corridor for Panorama Drive to be developed through to the Farnborough Road roundabout.

There is some farmland and some undeveloped bushland in Pacific Heights.

History
St Benedict's Catholic Primary School opened in 2009.

Education 
St Benedict's Catholic Primary School is a Catholic primary (Prep-6) school for boys and girls at 1 Laceys Road. In 2018, the school had an enrolment of 272 students with 23 teachers (18 full-time equivalent) and 13 non-teaching staff (7 full-time equivalent).

There are no government schools in Pacific Heights. The nearest government primary schools are Farnborough State School in neighbouring Farnborough to the north and Yeppoon State School in Yeppoon to the south. The nearest government secondary school is Yeppoon State High School in Yeppoon to the south.

Amenities 
There are a number of parks in Pacific Heights, including:

 Barnes Street Park
 Bradford Park

 Pacific Panorama Park

 Pacific Parklands

References 

Shire of Livingstone
Localities in Queensland